The California Military Academy is a military academy of the California Army National Guard located at Camp San Luis Obispo.

History
The school started as an idea of an "Officer Candidate School" (OCS) in 1950. However, a need for an academy in California convinced Major General Curtis D. O’Sullivan to start a program. The school's first graduating class was in 1951. During the next ten years, the program began to expand. However, the school was not called the California Military Academy until 1961, when training officially came under the new academy. In 1974, the first women graduates were commissioned from the program, two years before West Point started admitting women. The 223rd Infantry Regiment became the official school infantry. Today the academy continues the traditions started half a century ago.

One of the most prominent symbols of the academy is an eagle, found on the side of Guard Mountain.

Notable alumni
Charles Frederick Crocker-railroad business man
 Tom Selleck, actor

Original academy
From 1865 to 1920, the original academy was in Oakland. It was also known as McClure's Military Academy or the Oakland Military Academy.

See also
California National Guard
California Army National Guard
California State Guard
Theta Kappa Omega
223rd Infantry Regiment (United States)

References

Military academies of the United States
Military Academy
Schools in San Luis Obispo County, California
Educational institutions established in 1950
1950 establishments in California
Cuesta College
Government of San Luis Obispo County, California
Polytechnic Institute of New York University alumni